Nada Lazić is a Serbian politician. She served in the National Assembly of Serbia from 2014 to 2020 as a member of the League of Social Democrats of Vojvodina (Liga socijaldemokrata Vojvodine, LSV).

Early life and career
Lazić was born in Zrenjanin, Autonomous Province of Vojvodina, in what was then the People's Republic of Serbia in the Federal People's Republic of Yugoslavia. She completed elementary school and high school in nearby Novi Sad and graduated from the Faculty of Natural Sciences and Mathematics at the University of Novi Sad's Faculty of Chemistry in 1974. She later worked in water protection and related fields for the city of Novi Sad, and in 2002 she became an assistant to the secretary for environmental protection and sustainable development in the provincial government. Lazić retired in 2012.

Politician
Lazić joined the LSV in 1997 and was president of its women's forum from 2000 to 2005. The party took part in the 2003 Serbian parliamentary election as part of the Together for Tolerance (Zajedno za toleranciju, ZZT) coalition, and Lazić was included on its electoral list. The list narrowly missed crossing the electoral threshold for assembly representation.

She received the third position on the LSV-led Together for Vojvodina (Zajedno za Vojvodinu, ZZV) list for the Novi Sad city assembly in the 2004 Serbian local elections and was elected when the list won nine mandates. The Serbian Radical Party (Srpska radikalna stranka, SRS) won the election, and the LSV served in opposition for the next four years. Lazić also appeared on the ZZV list for the Assembly of Vojvodina in the concurrent 2004 provincial election, although she did not receive a mandate afterward.

The LSV contested the 2007 parliamentary election on the list of the Liberal Democratic Party (Liberalno demokratska partija, LDP), and Lazić appeared on the list in the 122nd position. The list won fifteen seats, and she was not chosen for a mandate. (From 2000 to 2011, Serbian parliamentary mandates were awarded to sponsoring parties or coalitions rather than to individual candidates, and it was common practice for the mandates to be assigned out of numerical order. Lazić could have been awarded a mandate despite her low position on the list, which was in any event mostly alphabetical.) She later appeared on the LSV's lists in the 2008 provincial election and in the 2008 local election in Novi Sad, though she was not afterward given a mandate at either level.

Parliamentarian
Serbia's electoral system was reformed in 2011, such that parliamentary mandates were awarded in numerical order to candidates on successful lists. The LSV contested the 2014 parliamentary election as part of a coalition led by former Serbian president Boris Tadić. Lazić received the eighteenth position on the coalition's list and was elected when it won exactly eighteen mandates. The Serbian Progressive Party (Srpska napredna stranka, SNS) and its allies won a majority victory in this election, and the LSV served in opposition. Lazić was deputy chair of the assembly committee on the rights of the child; a member of the committee for environmental protection; a deputy member of the committee for human and minority rights and gender equality; a deputy member of the committee on the economy, regional development, trade, tourism, and energy; a deputy member of the committee on education, science, technological development, and the information society; a deputy member of Serbia's delegation to the South-East European Cooperation Process parliamentary assembly; and a member of Serbia's parliamentary friendship groups with Austria, Azerbaijan, Japan, Portugal, and Slovenia.

For the 2016 parliamentary election, the LSV formed a coalition with the LDP and Tadić's Social Democratic Party (Socijaldemokratska stranka, SDS). Lazić received the third position on the list and was re-elected when it won thirteen mandates. The SNS and its allies won another majority victory, and the LSV continued in opposition. Lazić also appeared in the eighteenth position on the LSV's list in the concurrent 2016 Vojvodina provincial election and the fifteenth position on its list in the 2016 local election in Novi Sad; the lists respectively won nine and seven mandates, and she was not elected at either level.

In the 2016–20 parliament, Lazić continued to serve as deputy chair of the committee on the rights of the child and was a member of the environmental protection committee and the committee for agriculture, forestry, and water management; a deputy member of the education committee and the committee for European integration; a member of a subcommittee for monitoring the agricultural situation in Serbia's most underdeveloped areas; a member of Serbia's delegation to the parliamentary dimension of the Central European Initiative; and a member of the friendship groups with Austria, Germany, Slovenia, Sweden, and Turkey. She was also part of an informal parliamentary "Green Group."

The LSV contested the 2020 parliamentary election as part of the United Democratic Serbia alliance, and Lazić appeared in the thirty-fifth position on its list. The list did not cross the electoral threshold. She also received the twenty-fourth position on the LSV's list in the concurrent provincial election and was not elected when the list won seven mandates.

References

1950 births
Living people
Politicians from Zrenjanin
Politicians from Novi Sad
Scientists from Novi Sad
21st-century Serbian women politicians
21st-century Serbian politicians
Members of the National Assembly (Serbia)
Deputy Members of the South-East European Cooperation Process Parliamentary Assembly
Members of the Parliamentary Dimension of the Central European Initiative
League of Social Democrats of Vojvodina politicians
Women members of the National Assembly (Serbia)